David Grant may refer to:

Sportspeople
David Grant (American football) (born 1965), American football player
David Grant (Australian rules footballer) (born 1966), All Australian footballer from St Kilda
David Grant (footballer, born 1947), English footballer
David Grant (footballer, born 1960), English footballer
David Grant (rugby league) (1956–1994), Australian rugby league footballer
David Grant (cricketer) (born 1997), Australian cricketer

Others
David Grant (academic) (born 1947), Vice Chancellor of Cardiff University in Wales
David Grant (poet) (1823–1886), Scottish poet
David Grant (producer) (1939–1991), British photographer and producer of sexploitation films during the 1970s and 1980s
David Grant (singer) (born 1956), British pop singer and celebrity vocal coach
David Marshall Grant (born 1955), American actor and playwright
David Norvell Walker Grant (1891–1964), U.S. Army general and doctor

See also
Dave Grant (1958–2010), Australian comedian